The Prime of Miss Jean Brodie can refer to:

 The Prime of Miss Jean Brodie (novel), a 1961 novel by Muriel Spark
 The Prime of Miss Jean Brodie, a 1966 stage play based on the novel, starring Vanessa Redgrave and Olivia Hussey, which later transferred to Broadway starring Zoe Caldwell
 The Prime of Miss Jean Brodie (film), a 1969 film based on the novel, starring Maggie Smith
 The Prime of Miss Jean Brodie (TV series), a 1978 TV series based on the novel, starring Geraldine McEwan